The Little Pigeon River is a river located entirely within Sevier County, Tennessee. It rises from a series of streams which flow together on the dividing ridge between the states of Tennessee and North Carolina, with most of the flow from inside the boundary of the Great Smoky Mountains National Park. The river has three main forks or prongs, East, Middle, and West.

The East and Middle prongs are less notable divisions of the river, with the Middle Prong emerging from the Greenbrier area of the Great Smoky Mountains National Park and paralleled for most of its remaining length by State Route 416 up to its confluence with the East Fork near U.S. Route 411.  The East Fork is the only division in which the main stem does not emerge from the national park, formed by a series of small streams in the foothills of English Mountain draining large portions of the Camp Hollow, Pearl Valley, Ball Hollow, and Jones Cove valleys and running along State Road 339.  The Harrisburg Covered Bridge is a landmark structure from the 1800s that crosses the East Fork. The West Fork is far better known because it drains the major tourist towns of Gatlinburg and Pigeon Forge. The Old Mill of Pigeon Forge, a working grist mill constructed in 1830 by Isaac Love on a milldam impoundment of the West Fork in downtown Pigeon Forge, is one of the best examples of 19th century hydropower technology, as well as being one of the most photographed mills in America.  The confluence of the West and East forks is at Sevierville at Forks of the River.  From there the stream continues to flow northward, paralleled by State Route 66, until its confluence with the French Broad River just downstream from Douglas Dam.

Despite its name, it is not a tributary of the nearby Pigeon River, which flows into the French Broad well above Douglas Dam and the resultant reservoir.

See also
List of rivers of Tennessee

References

Tributaries of the French Broad River
Rivers of Tennessee
Rivers of Sevier County, Tennessee
Great Smoky Mountains National Park
Gatlinburg, Tennessee